Pan bazar is a locality situated near 'James Street' at Secunderabad in Hyderabad city, Telangana, India. Pan bazar is a residential and commercial area in the heart of the city.

Economy
A wide variety of businesses consisting of wholesale cloth merchants, gold merchants, hardware equipment stores, steel market stores and transportation companies are located here.

References

Neighbourhoods in Hyderabad, India